Aigialus parvus is a fungus species of the genus of Aigialus. Aigialus parvus produces a number of bioactive compounds like Aigialomycin B, Aigialomycin D, Aigialospirol and Aigialone.

References

Fungi described in 1986